Balliol College, Oxford, one of the constituent colleges of the University of Oxford, is governed by the Master and Fellows of the college. The Master, when elected, must be "the person who is, in their [the Fellows'] judgement, most fit for the government of the College as a place of religion, learning, and education". Although the rules in no way suggest a preference for an alumnus/alumna or Fellow of the college to be chosen, there have been few who were not: only one Master in the 20th century had no previous connection with the college (David Lindsay Keir 1946-1964) and the previous non-member to hold the post before that was Theophilus Leigh, elected in 1726. However the current Master of Balliol, Helen Ghosh, studied at St Hugh's and Hertford colleges.

References

 

Balliol Masters
 
Balliol